Mexicana Cargo was an airline based in Mexico City.

It started operations in the 1980s and ceased operations in 1987. It was a Mexicana de Aviación subsidiary and operated cargo flights in Mexico and the United States.

Destinations
Domestic
Cancún
Guadalajara
Mexico City
Monterrey
Tijuana

International
Chicago
Los Angeles
Miami
Havana

Fleet
 3 Douglas DC-8

References

Defunct cargo airlines
Defunct airlines of Mexico
Airlines established in 1980
Airlines disestablished in 1987
Mexicana de Aviación
1987 disestablishments in Mexico
Cargo airlines of Mexico